Brachychthoniidae is a family of oribatids in the order Oribatida. There are about 11 genera and at least 150 described species in Brachychthoniidae.

Genera
 Brachychthonius Berlese, 1910
 Eobrachychthonius Jacot, 1936
 Liochthonius Hammen, 1959
 Mixochthonius Niedbala, 1972
 Neobrachychthonius Moritz, 1976
 Neoliochthonius Lee, 1982
 Papillochthonius Gil-Martín, Subías & Arillo, 1992
 Poecilochthonius Balogh, 1943
 Sellnickochthonius Krivolutsky, 1964
 Synchthonius Hammen, 1952
 Verachthonius Moritz, 1976

References

Further reading

 
 
 
 

Acariformes
Acari families